The Irish League in season 1965–66 comprised 12 teams, and Linfield won the championship.

League standings

Results

References
Northern Ireland - List of final tables (RSSSF)

NIFL Premiership seasons
1965–66 in Northern Ireland association football
Northern